The Noman Çelebicihan Battalion was a Crimean Tatar volunteer battalion named after Noman Çelebicihan formed in 2016 and disbanded on the same year. The base of the battalion was in the Kherson region bordering Crimea.

History
The battalion emerged from participants in the 2015 activist-led blockade of Crimea that stopped Ukrainian cargo from reaching the Crimean peninsula. The battalion was planned to include 560 people.

The Crimean Tatar battalion reportedly received assistance from a volunteer Turkey in 2016 shortly after founding. 

In 2016 the battalion helped the State Border Guard Service of Ukraine in the region bordering Crimea. The battalion virtually ceased to exist around the end of the same year, with many of its volunteers joining other battalions or enlisting into the Ukrainian army.

 (Crimean Tatar: Qırım Haber Ajansı) reported that the battalion was formed again on February 24, 2022 following the Russian invasion of Ukraine.

On June 1, 2022, the Supreme Court of Russia recognized the Noman Çelebicihan Battalion as a terrorist organization.

See also 
 Ukrainian volunteer battalions (since 2014)
 Noman Çelebicihan
 Crimean Tatars
 Krym Battalion

References 

History of Crimea
History of Kherson Oblast
Politics of the Crimean Tatars
Volunteer military formations of Ukraine
Annexation of Crimea by the Russian Federation
Military units and formations established in 2015
2015 establishments in Ukraine